Erin Joyce Brady (born November 5, 1987) is an American television host, model and beauty pageant titleholder who won Miss USA 2013. She then represented the US at Miss Universe 2013 in Moscow, Russia, on November 9, where she placed in the Top 10.  Brady is the first woman from the state of Connecticut ever to be crowned Miss USA.

Pageants

Miss Connecticut USA 2013
Brady was crowned Miss Connecticut USA 2013. This was her second attempt at the state title, having placed 1st runner-up the previous year.

Miss USA 2013
Brady competed in the Miss USA 2013 competition on June 16, 2013, representing the state of Connecticut. She was crowned the new Miss USA by the outgoing titleholder Nana Meriwether, Miss USA 2012. Brady became the first delegate from the state of Connecticut to be crowned Miss USA.

Miss Universe 2013
Erin represented the United States at the 62nd annual Miss Universe competition on November 9, 2013,  vying to succeed outgoing titleholder Miss Universe 2012, Olivia Culpo of the U.S. She eventually placed in the top 10 exactly at 6th place.

Personal life

Brady graduated from Portland High School in 2005, then went on to graduate from Central Connecticut State University in 2010 with a degree in finance and a minor in criminal justice.  In 2014, she gave the address at CCSU's undergraduate commencement. She is a financial accountant for Prudential Retirement in Hartford, Connecticut.

She has helped with the Ferrari and Friends Concorso, which works closely with the Children's Medical Hospital and the "Make-A-Wish Foundation"; Susan G. Komen, Walk for The Cure and Habitat for Humanity as her charities of choice.  It is her goal to be an advocate for children of alcohol addicts, a decision influenced by her own childhood.

In August 2013, she was inducted in the New York City's Ride of Fame.

Brady married Tony Capasso on December 13, 2014. The couple were scheduled to marry on November 9, 2013, the same day she competed in the Miss Universe pageant in Moscow.  In accordance with the Miss USA rules, Brady and Capasso had to wait until Brady had completed her year as the titleholder. In 2020, Brady married Nick Colagiovanni. Her cousins are Marc and Dean.

References

External links 
Miss USA 2014 Red Carpet Event

Living people
1987 births
Miss USA winners
American beauty pageant winners
People from East Hampton, Connecticut
Central Connecticut State University alumni
Miss Universe 2013 contestants
Female models from Connecticut
21st-century American women